The Fourth Circuit Court of the Supreme People's Court of People's Republic of China, opened at December 28, 2016 in Zhengzhou. It acts in the same authority as the Supreme People's Court and has jurisdiction in Henan, Shanxi, Anhui, and Hubei provinces.

References

External links 

Supreme People's Court
Zhengzhou
2016 establishments in China
Courts and tribunals established in 2016